Punta Sur marks the southern point of Cozumel and is part of the Parque Punta Sur, a  ecological park that covers the reefs, beaches, lagoons, and low forest of the surrounding area. The reef system is also part of the Arrecifes de Cozumel National Park.

The Celarain lighthouse (Faro de Celarain) sits on the Punta Sur promontory (Punta Celarain) and is part of a nautical museum. Just northeast of it is the Caracol (Tumba del Caracol), a Maya building erected during the post-classic period.  There is a persistent myth, often repeated by tour guides, that the building functioned as a weather alarm, producing a whistle that would precede the arrival of a hurricane, but that is only a legend.  The idea that the building somehow functioned as a lighthouse or beacon used to send signals to the mainland is another legend, but also incorrect; it was a temple and nothing more.

Some of the sandy beaches are protected to allow hatching for sea turtles. Observation towers have been erected at the Columbia lagoon to watch wildlife. Off Punta Sur is the Devil's Throat scuba diving area, while in the closer reef visitors can snorkel. The dirt road area is accessible to off-road vehicles and allows some tours to access the area as part of a guided excursion. At the end of the dirt road you will find 2 beach clubs, Papito's Beach Club Restaurant and Bar as well as the Punta Sur Beach Club. Included in the entrance fee to Punta Sur Park is also a guided boat ride on the Colombia Lagoon for bird watching, sightseeing, crocodile observation and more.

See also

Yucatan Peninsula
Cozumel
Cancun
Cozumel (archaeological site)

References

External links
 Punta Sur Photo Essay

External links
 INAH
 Punta Sur Park Cozumel Mexico 
 About Cozumel Mexico
 

Parks in Mexico
Maya sites in Quintana Roo
Sur, Punta
Cozumel
Protected areas of Quintana Roo
Landforms of Quintana Roo